Kamea Dance Company is a dance company based in Beer Sheva, Israel.

History
Kamea dance company was established in Beer Sheva in 2002 by Daniella Schapira and Tamir Ginz. The company is affiliated with Beer-Sheva Municipal Dance Center. The company performs works by Ginz and by guest choreographers. Company regularly performs in Suzanne Dellal Center for Dance and Theater in Tel Aviv.  Kamea dance company worked with Nacho Duato. In 2017, company created dance version of Johann Sebastian Bach oratorio St Matthew Passion.

Notable performances 
 Bamidbar Devarim. Choreography by Tamir Ginz. Premiered in Suzanne Dellal Center for Dance and Theater.
 Gnawa. Choreography by Nacho Duato.
 St Matthew Passion. Choreography by Tamir Ginz. Premiered in Erholungshaus Leverkusen.

References

External links 
 Official Site

Dance companies in Israel
Contemporary dance